Årefjellet is a mountain in Oscar II Land at Spitsbergen, Svalbard. It has an altitude of 882m, and is located at the northern part of the ridge Jämtlandryggen. It borders to the glaciers Sveabreen and Wahlenbergbreen.

References

Mountains of Spitsbergen